Kangnam County is one of the two suburban counties of Pyongyang, North Korea. It is north-west of Songrim, north-east of Hwangju County, west of Chunghwa County, and south of Nakrang-guyok. It is the location of cooperative farms and smaller industrial complexes. It became part of Pyongyang in May 1963, when it was separated from South P'yŏngan. In 2010, it was administratively reassigned from Pyongyang to North Hwanghae; foreign media attributed the change as an attempt to relieve shortages in Pyongyang's food distribution system. However, it was returned to Pyongyang in 2011.

Divisions 
The county is divided into one town (up), and 18 'ri' (villages).

References 

Districts of Pyongyang
Counties of North Korea